Coutaportla is a genus of flowering plants in the family Rubiaceae. It is found in Mexico and Guatemala.

Species
Coutaportla ghiesbreghtiana (Baill.) Urb.  - Puebla, Oaxaca
Coutaportla guatemalensis (Standl.) Lorence - Veracruz, Chiapas, Guatemala
Coutaportla pailensis Villarreal - Coahuila

References

External links
Coutaportla in the World Checklist of Rubiaceae

Rubiaceae genera
Chiococceae